Nicholas Biddle (1786–1844) was an American banker and President of the Second Bank of the United States.

Nicholas Biddle may also refer to:
 Nicholas Biddle (naval officer) (1750–1778), officer in the American Continental Navy
 Nicholas Biddle, a First Defender injured in the Baltimore riot of 1861
 SS Nicholas Biddle, a Liberty ship